The 2000–01 Slovenian Second League season started on 13 August 2000 and ended on 10 June 2001. Each team played a total of 29 matches.

League standing

See also
2000–01 Slovenian PrvaLiga
2000–01 Slovenian Third League

References
NZS archive

External links
Football Association of Slovenia 

Slovenian Second League seasons
2000–01 in Slovenian football
Slovenia